Tord Tamerlan Teodor Thorell (3 May 1830 – 22 December 1901) was a Swedish arachnologist.

Thorell studied spiders with Giacomo Doria at the Museo Civico di Storia Naturale de Genoa. He corresponded with other arachnologists, such as Octavius Pickard-Cambridge, Eugène Simon and Thomas Workman.

He described more than 1,000 spider species during his time from the 1850 to 1900.

Thorell wrote: On European Spiders (1869) and Synonym of European Spiders (1870-73).

Taxonomic honors
The Orb-weaver spider genus Thorellina and the jumping spider genus Thorelliola are named after him, as well as about 30 species of spiders:
 Araneus thorelli (Roewer, 1942) (Myanmar) (Araneidae)
 Gasteracantha thorelli Keyserling, 1864 (Madagascar) (Araneidae)
 Leviellus thorelli (Ausserer, 1871) (Europe) (Araneidae)
 Mandjelia thorelli (Raven, 1990) (Queensland) (Barychelidae)
 Clubiona thorelli Roewer, 1951 (Sumatra) (Clubionidae)
 Malamatidia thorelli Deeleman-Reinhold, 2001 (Sulawesi) (Clubionidae)
 Corinnomma thorelli Simon, 1905 (Java) (Corinnidae)
 Ctenus thorelli F. O. P.-Cambridge, 1897 (Sri Lanka) (Ctenidae)
 Zelotes thorelli Simon, 1914 (Southern Europe) (Gnaphosidae)
 Hypochilus thorelli Marx, 1888  (USA) (Hypochilidae)
 Idiops thorelli O. P.-Cambridge, 1870 (South Africa) (Idiopidae)
 Trichopterna thorelli (Westring, 1861) (Palearctic) (Linyphiidae)
 Lycosa thorelli (Keyserling, 1877) (Colombia to Argentina) (Lycosidae)
 Lycosula thorelli (Berland, 1929)  (Samoa, Marquesas Is.) (Lycosidae)
 Pardosa thorelli (Collett, 1876) (Norway) (Lycosidae)
 Mecicobothrium thorelli Holmberg, 1882  (Argentina, Uruguay) (Mecicobothriidae)
 Miturga thorelli Simon, 1909 (Western Australia) (Miturgidae)
 Spermophora thorelli Roewer, 1942 (Myanmar) (Pholcidae)
 Cispius thorelli Blandin, 1978 (Congo) (Pisauridae)
 Bavia thorelli Simon, 1901 (Sulawesi) (Salticidae)
 Pancorius thorelli (Simon, 1899) (Sumatra) (Salticidae)
 Talavera thorelli (Kulczyn'ski, 1891) (Palearctic) (Salticidae)
 Pseudopoda thorelli Jäger, 2001 (Myanmar) (Sparassidae)
 Afroblemma thorelli (Brignoli, 1974)  (Angola, Tanzania) (Tetrablemmidae)
 Mesida thorelli (Blackwall, 1877) (Seychelles) (Tetragnathidae)
 Chilobrachys thorelli Pocock, 1900 (India) (Theraphosidae)
 Cyriopagopus thorelli (Simon, 1901) (Malaysia) (Theraphosidae)
 Helvibis thorelli Keyserling, 1884  (Peru, Brazil) (Theridiidae)
 Theridion thorelli L. Koch, 1865 (New South Wales) (Theridiidae)
 Tmarus thorelli Comellini, 1955 (Congo) (Thomisidae)

Works
 1856: Recensio critica aranearum suecicarum quas descripserunt Clerckius, Linnaeus, de Geerus. N. Act. reg. Soc. sci. Upsal. (3) 2(1): 61-176.
 1858: Om Clercks original-spindelsammlung. Öfvers. Kongl. vet. Akad. Förh. 15: 143–154.
 1858: Till kännedomen om slägten a Mithras och Uloborus. Öfvers. Kongl. vet. Akad. Förh. 15: 191–205.
 1859: Nya exotiska Epeirider. Öfvers. Kongl. vet. Akad. Förh. 16: 299–304.
 1868: Arachnida. In Eisen, G. & A. Stuxberg, Bidrag till kännedomen om Gotska-Sandön. Öfvers. Kongl. vet. Akad. Förh. 25: 379.
 1868: Araneae. Species novae minusve cognitae. In Virgin, C. A., Kongliga Svenska Fregatten Eugenies Resa omkring Jorden. Uppsala, Zoologi, Arachnida, pp. 1–34.
 1869: On European spiders. Part I. Review of the European genera of spiders, preceded by some observations on zoological nomenclature. Nova Acta reg. Soc. sci. Upsaliae (3) 7: 1–108.
 1870: Remarks on synonyms of European spiders. Part I. Uppsala, pp. 1–96.
 1870: On European spiders. Nov. Act. reg. Soc. sci. Upsaline (3) 7: 109–242.
 1870: Araneae nonnullae Novae Hollandie, descriptae. Öfvers. Kongl. vet. Akad. Förh. 27: 367–389.
 1871: Remarks on synonyms of European spiders. Part II. Uppsala, pp. 97–228.
 1871: Om Arachnider fran Spitsbergin och Beeren-Eiland. Öfvers. Kongl. vet. Akad. Förh. 28: 683-702
 1872: Remarks on synonyms of European spiders. Part III. Upsala, pp. 229–374.
 1872: Om några Arachnider från Grönland. Öfvers. Kongl. vet. Akad. Förh. 29: 147–166.
 1873: Remarks on synonyms of European spiders. Part IV. Uppsala, pp. 375–645.
 1875: Diagnoses Aranearum Europaearum aliquot novarum. Tijdschr. Ent. 18: 81-108.
 1875: Verzeichniss südrussischer Spinnen. Horae Soc. ent. Ross. 11: 39-122.
 1875: Descriptions of several European and North African spiders. Kongl. Svenska. Vet.-Akad. Handl. 13(5): 1–203.
 1875: Notice of some spiders from Labrador. Proc. Boston Soc. nat. Hist. 17: 490–504.
 1875: On some spiders from New-Caledonia, Madagascar and Réunion. Proc. zool. Soc. Lond. 1875: 130–149.
 1877: Due ragni esotici descritti. Ann. Mus. civ. stor. nat. Genova 9: 301–310.
 1877: Studi sui Ragni Malesi e Papuani. I. Ragni di Selebes raccolti nel 1874 dal Dott. O. Beccari. Ann. Mus. civ. stor. nat. Genova 10: 341–637.
 1877: Descriptions of the Araneae collected in Colorado in 1875, by A. S. Packard jun., M.D. Bull. U. S. geol. Surv. 3: 477–529.
 1878: Notice of the spiders of the 'Polaris' expedition. Amer. Natural. 12: 393–396.
 1878: Studi sui ragni Malesi e Papuani. II. Ragni di Amboina raccolti Prof. O. Beccari. Ann. Mus. civ. stor. nat. Genova 13: 1–317.
 1881: Studi sui Ragni Malesi e Papuani. III. Ragni dell'Austro Malesia e del Capo York, conservati nel Museo civico di storia naturale di Genova. Ann. Mus. civ. stor. nat. Genova 17: 1–727.
 1887: Viaggio di L. Fea in Birmania e regioni vicine. II. Primo saggio sui ragni birmani. Ann. Mus. civ. stor. nat. Genova 25: 5–417.
 1890: Studi sui ragni Malesi e Papuani. IV, 1. Ann. Mus. civ. stor. nat. Genova 28: 1–419.
 1890: Aracnidi di Nias e di Sumatra raccolti nel 1886 dal Sig. E. Modigliani. Ann. Mus. civ. stor. nat. Genova 30: 5–106.
 1890: Diagnoses aranearum aliquot novarum in Indo-Malesia inventarum. Ann. Mus. civ. stor. nat. Genova 30: 132–172.
 1890: Arachnidi di Pinang raccolti nel 1889 dai Signori L. Loria e L. Fea. Ann. Mus. civ. stor. nat. Genova 30: 269–383.
 1891: Spindlar från Nikobarerna och andra delar af södra Asien. Kongl. Svenska. Vet.-Acad. Handl. 24(2): 1–149.
 1892: Novae species aranearum a Cel. Th. Workman in ins. Singapore collectae. Boll. Soc. ent. ital. 24: 209–252.
 1892: On some spiders from the Andaman Islands, collected by E. W. Oates, Esq. Ann. Mag. nat. Hist. (6) 9: 226–237.
 1892: Studi sui ragni Malesi e Papuani. IV, 2. Ann. Mus. civ. stor. nat. Genova 31: 1–490.
 1894: Förteckning öfver arachnider från Java och närgrändsande öar, insamlade af Carl Aurivillius; jemte beskrifningar å några sydasiatiska och sydamerikanska spindlar. Bih. Svenska. Vet.-Akad. Handl. 20(4): 1-63.
 1894: Decas aranearum in ins. Singapore a Cel. Th. Workman inventarum. Boll. Soc. ent. ital. 26: 321–355.
 1895: Descriptive catalogue of the spiders of Burma
 1897, with J. Castelnau: Notes sur Hyptiotes anceps. Feuille jeun. Natural. 27: 107–111.
 1897: Viaggio di Leonardo Fea in Birmania e regioni vicine. LXXIII. Secondo saggio sui Ragni birmani. I. Parallelodontes. Tubitelariae. Ann. Mus. civ. stor. nat. Genova (2) 17[=37]: 161–267.
 1897: Araneae paucae Asiae australis. Bih. Svenska. Vet.-Akad. Handl. 22(6): 1-36.
 1898: Viaggio di Leonardo Fea in Birmania e regioni vicine. LXXX. Secondo saggio sui Ragni birmani. II. Retitelariae et Orbitelariae. Ann. Mus. civ. stor. nat. Genova (2) 19[=39]: 271–378.
 1899: Araneae Camerunenses (Africae occidentalis) quas anno 1891 collegerunt Cel. Dr Y. Sjöstedt aliique. Bih. Svenska. Vet.-Akad. Handl. 25(1): 1–105.

References

External links
 

Swedish arachnologists
1830 births
1901 deaths
19th-century Swedish zoologists
Members of the Royal Society of Sciences in Uppsala